Lexington Army Depot is a former United States Army facility located in Avon, Kentucky. In 1964, it was paired with Blue Grass Army Depot to form Lexington-Blue Grass Army Depot. In 1999, the facility was closed after the recommendation of the 1988 Base Realignment and Closure Commission.

References

United States Army arsenals
United States Army arsenals during World War II
Closed installations of the United States Army